The No. 4 Schoolhouse is an historic school building on Farrington Road near Sunrise Avenue in Barre, Massachusetts.  The one-room wood-frame schoolhouse was built in 1883, and was at least the second schoolhouse in the town's fourth district.  The building served as a schoolhouse until 1930, when the town centralized its schools.  In 1937 the building was purchased by a local community organization dedicated to its preservation.  It has served as a community center since then.

The building was listed on the National Register of Historic Places in 1988.

See also
National Register of Historic Places listings in Worcester County, Massachusetts

References

School buildings on the National Register of Historic Places in Massachusetts
Schools in Worcester County, Massachusetts
School buildings completed in 1883
National Register of Historic Places in Worcester County, Massachusetts
Buildings and structures in Barre, Massachusetts